This is a list of members of the Australian House of Representatives from 1993 to 1996, as elected at the 1993 federal election.

Notes
  Labor member John Kerin resigned in December 1993; Labor candidate Mark Latham won the resulting by-election on 29 January 1994.
  Labor member John Dawkins resigned in February 1994; Labor candidate Carmen Lawrence won the resulting by-election on 12 March 1994.
  Labor member Neal Blewett resigned in February 1994; Labor candidate Martyn Evans won the resulting by-election on 19 March 1994.
  Liberal member Jim Carlton resigned in January 1994; Liberal candidate Bronwyn Bishop won the resulting by-election on 26 March 1994.
  Liberal member Michael MacKellar resigned in February 1994; Liberal candidate Tony Abbott won the resulting by-election on 26 March 1994.
  Liberal member Andrew Peacock resigned in September 1994; Liberal candidate Petro Georgiou won the resulting by-election on 19 November 1994.
  Labor member Ros Kelly resigned in January 1995; Liberal candidate Brendan Smyth won the resulting by-election on 25 March 1995.
  Liberal member John Hewson resigned in February 1995; Liberal candidate Andrew Thomson won the resulting by-election on 8 April 1995.

References

Members of Australian parliaments by term
20th-century Australian politicians